Legacy of Heathens is the first studio album by Finnish Folk metal band Falchion. The band featured Korpiklaani member Juho Kauppinen on vocals and guitar.

Track listing
All songs written by Juho Kauppinen.

 "Immortal Heroes" - 5:30 	
 "The Ancient Tale" - 4:07 	
 "Folk in the Golden Town" (Instrumental) - 4:12 	
 "Broken Stone" - 6:19
 "Journey in the Woods" - 6:27 	
 "Swordmaster of the Dragonland" - 4:55 	
 "The Darkest Valleys of Myst" - 4:13 	
 "Burning the Gates" - 6:59 	
 "Black Crown" - 4:50

Personnel
 Juho Kauppinen - vocals, lead & rhythm guitars
 Jani Laine - rhythm & lead guitars
 Seppo Tiaskorpi - bass
 Teemu Peltonen - drums

External links 
 

Falchion (band) albums
2005 debut albums